The Renner Village Archeological Site (23PL1) is a prehistoric archaeological site located in the municipality of Riverside, Platte County, Missouri. It was a village site inhabited from approximately 1 CE to 500 CE by peoples of the Kansas City Hopewell culture and through the Woodland period to 1200 CE by peoples of the Middle Mississippian culture. It was added to the National Historic Register on April 16, 1969.

Excavations
Archaeologists have found artifacts relating to the Hopewell and Middle Mississippian at the site, which is one of several Kansas City Hopewell sites located near the junction of Line Creek and the Missouri River.

The site was first excavated by Waldo Wedel of the US National Museum in 1937. He discovered decorated pottery styles typical of Hopewell pottery. It was excavated for a second time in 1954 by the Kansas City Archaeological Society and a third time by Gary Brenner from 1980 to 1993.

During the summer of 2009 the site was the subject of local controversy over the building of a new playground at the location. The city council of Riverside listened to testimony from archaeologists and local residents and decided to pay for rescue excavations at the site. Cultural Resource Services Group at SCI Engineering was contracted to do the excavation work in the summer of 2009 and the area was opened to the public in the spring of 2010 as Renner-Brenner Park, named for two families who had owned the site.

See also
 Hopewell tradition
 List of Hopewell sites

References

Kansas City Hopewell
Middle Mississippian culture
Archaeological sites on the National Register of Historic Places in Missouri
History of Kansas City, Missouri
Geography of Platte County, Missouri
National Register of Historic Places in Platte County, Missouri